Dr. Harriet Harriss (born 1973), (RIBA, ARB, FRSA, (Assoc.)AIA, FHEA, RA) is a UK-licensed architect, writer, and historian, and served as the Dean of the Pratt School of Architecture in Brooklyn, New York from 2019-2022. Prior to this, she led the Architecture Research Program at the Royal College of Art in London until 2015 and the Masters in Architecture Program at Oxford Brookes from 2009-2015. Her scholarship principally concerns pioneering pedagogies in architectural education and confronts themes such as feminism; equity, decolonization, diversity and inclusion; civic engagement; the climate crisis, and queer ecologies. After graduating from the Royal College of Art in 2003, Dr. Harriss established Design Heroine Architects - a participatory design practice that secured NESTA start-up funding in recognition of its social innovation objectives in 2004. Throughout her academic career, Harriet won various awards for teaching and research, including, a Diawa Foundation Fellowship, two Santander Awards, a Brookes Teaching Fellowship, a Winston Churchill Fellowship, and a HEA Internationalisation fellowship. In 2016, Dr. Harriss was awarded a Clore Fellowship for cultural leadership, elected to the European Association of Architectural Education Council (EAAE) in summer 2017, and in 2018, awarded a Principal Fellowship of the UK's Higher Education Academy. Harriet's consultancy roles include the UK Department for Education construction industry T-Level panel, international program validations, external examining, and pedagogy design and development. From 2018-2020, Dr. Harriet Harriss chaired the RIBA's prestigious Dissertation Medal judging panel and in 2016, secured a 500k Euro research grant from Erasmus to lead an international consortium investigating the trans-sector applications of an architecture degree. Dr. Harriss has spoken across a wide range of media channels (from the BBC, Fox News, and Monocle Radio to TEDx) on the wider issues facing the built environment. Dr. Harriss is also recognized as an advocate for diversity and inclusion within design education and was nominated by Dezeen as a champion for women in architecture and design in 2019. Her books include Architecture Live Projects: pedagogy into practice (2015),  Radical Pedagogies: Architectural Education & the British Tradition (2015), A Gendered Profession (2016), Interior Futures (2019), Architects After Architecture (2020), Greta Magnusson Grossman: Modern Design From Sweden To California  (2020).   Her forthcoming books include Architectural Pedagogies of the Global South  (2021), The Architecture of the Post-Anthropocene (2022).

Biography 

Harriss was born in Hampshire, UK and holds British and Irish Nationality. Before attending Manchester University to study an BA (HONS) in Architecture in 1997, she qualified as a youth worker and worked with children at risk  in Manchester, UK, Quito, Ecuador and Johannesburg, South Africa. Having secured a prestigious Bradshaw Gas Scholarship at the end of her second year of her BA Architecture, she spent four months building a clinic in a mountain village close to Himla, in Nepal with The Nepal Trust. Thereafter, she took a job as a lighthouse assistant with the National Parks and Wildlife Service at Greencape Lighthouse in Disaster Bay, Australia.

Career 
After graduating from the Royal College of Art in 2003, Dr. Harriss established Design Heroine Architects - a participatory design practice that won start-up funding for its social innovation objectives from NESTA in 2004. Throughout her academic career, Harriet won various awards for teaching and research, including, a Diawa Foundation Fellowship, two Santander Awards, a Brookes Teaching Fellowship, a Winston Churchill Fellowship, and a HEA Internationalisation fellowship. In 2016, Dr. Harriss was awarded a Clore Fellowship for cultural leadership, elected to the European Association of Architectural Education Council (EAAE) in summer 2017, and in 2018, awarded a Principal Fellowship of the UK's Higher Education Academy.

Harriet's consultancy roles include the UK Department for Education construction industry T-Level panel, international program validations, external examining, and pedagogy design and development. From 2018-2020, Dr. Harriet Harriss chaired the RIBA's prestigious Dissertation Medal judging panel in 2018  and in 2016, secured a 500k Euro research grant from Erasmus to lead an international consortium investigating the trans-sector applications of an architecture degree. Dr. Harriss has spoken across a wide range of media channels (from the BBC, Fox News, and Monacle Radio to TEDxNYIT ) on the wider issues facing the built environment. Dr. Harriss is also recognized as an advocate for diversity and inclusion within design education and was nominated by Dezeen as a champion for women in architecture and design in 2019. Her books include Architecture Live Projects: pedagogy into practice (2015),  Radical Pedagogies: Architectural Education & the British Tradition (2015), A Gendered Profession (2016), Interior Futures (2019), Architects After Architecture (2020), Greta Magnusson Grossman: Modern Design From Sweden To California (2020).  Architects After Architecture (2020), Greta Magnusson Grossman: Modern Design From Sweden To California (2020). Her forthcoming books include Architectural Pedagogies of the Global South (2021), The Architecture of the Post-Anthropocene (2022).

She is the recipient of a Clore Fellowship and a Churchill Fellowship

In 2019 she was appointed Dean of Pratt Institute School of Architecture.

Awards and recognition 

 2018 Awarded Principal Fellowship of the UK Higher Education Academy (FHEA) 
 2016-17 CLORE Fellowship - Leadership Programme  
 2016 A Design Award ‘Social’ Category: Refugee Wearable Project  
 2013 Santander Staff Development Award & Santander Scholars Award  
 2013 Higher Education Academy HEA Seminar Award, HEIF Award, BBC Expert Women Award  
 2012 Higher Education Academy (HEA) Internationalisation Fellowship Awardee  
 2011 Winston Churchill Memorial Trust Travelling Fellowship  
 2010-12 Oxford Brookes Associate Teaching Fellowship

Bibliography 

 2014 (with Lynnette Widder) Architecture Live Projects: Pedagogy into Practice; Abingdon: Routledge. 
 2015 (with Daisy Froud) Radical Pedagogies: Architectural Education and the British Tradition; London: RIBA Books. 
 2016 (with James Benedict Brown, Ruth Morrow and James Soane) A Gendered Profession: The Question of Representation in Space Making; London: RIBA Books. 
 2019 (with Graeme Brooker and Kevin Walker) Interior Futures; Yountville, Ca.: Crucible Press. 
2020 (with Rory Hyde and Roberta Marcaccio)Architects After Architecture.  
2020 (with Naomi House) Greta Magnusson Grossman: Modern Design From Sweden To California.

References 

British women architects
British women educators
British educators
Pratt Institute faculty
Women deans (academic)
21st-century British women writers
British expatriate academics in the United States
Living people
Alumni of the University of Manchester
Alumni of the Royal College of Art
Alumni of Kingston University
Alumni of Oxford Brookes University
Academics of Oxford Brookes University
Academics of the Royal College of Art
New York Institute of Technology faculty
Parsons School of Design faculty
University of Detroit Mercy faculty
Columbia University faculty
British university and college faculty deans
British architecture writers
Irish architects
1973 births
Principal Fellows of the Higher Education Academy